Integrated coastal zone management (ICZM), integrated coastal management (ICM), or integrated coastal planning is a coastal management process for the management of the coast using an integrated approach, regarding all aspects of the coastal zone, including geographical and political boundaries, in an attempt to achieve sustainability. This concept was born in 1992 during the Earth Summit of Rio de Janeiro. The specifics regarding ICZM is set out in the proceedings of the summit within Agenda 21, Chapter 17.

Framework
ICZM provides a global common thought process and decision making framework which is flexible enough to find solutions tailored to the diverse range of world's as well as unique national, regional and local coastline and coastal environments and needs.

ICZM management must embrace a holistic viewpoint of the functions that makeup the complex and dynamic nature of interactions in the coastal environment. Management framework must be applied to a defined geographical limit (often complicated) and should operate with a high level of integration.

Importance

Significance and management of coastal zones 

The Integrated Coastal Zone Management (ICZM) is a key element for the sustainable development of coastal zones. However this recent notion may not be adapted to all cases. The natural disasters Sumatra earthquake and the Indian Ocean tsunami have made a lot of impact on the coastal environment and also the stakeholder's perception on mitigation and management of coastal hazards. 

The dynamic processes that occur within the coastal zones produce diverse and productive ecosystems which have been of great importance historically for human populations. Coastal margins equate to only 8% of the worlds surface area but provide 25% of global productivity. Stress on this environment comes with approximately 70% of the world's population being within a day's walk of the coast. Two-thirds of the world's cities occur on the coast.

Valuable resources such as fish and minerals are considered to be common property and are in high demand for coastal dwellers for subsistence use, recreation and economic development. Through the perception of common property, these resources have been subjected to intensive and specific exploitation. For example; 90% of the world's fish harvest comes from within national exclusive economic zones, most of which are within the sight of shore. This type of practice has led to a problem that has cumulative effects. The addition of other activities adds to the strain placed on this environment. As a whole, human activity in the coastal zone generally degrades the systems by taking unsustainable quantities of resources. The effects are further exacerbated with the input of pollutant wastes. This provides the need for management. Due to the complex nature of human activity in this zone a holistic approach is required to obtain a sustainable outcome.

Goals 

For ICZM to be successful it must adhere to the principles that define sustainability and act upon them in ways that are integrated. An optimal balance between environmental protection and the development of economic and social sectors is paramount. As part of the holistic approach ICZM applies, many aspects within a coastal zone are expected to be considered and accounted for. These include but are not limited to: the spatial, functional, legal, policy, knowledge, and participation dimensions. Below are four identified goals of ICZM:

	Maintaining the functional integrity of the coastal resource systems;
	Reducing resource-use conflicts;
	Maintaining the health of the environment;
	Facilitating the progress of multisectoral development

Failure to include these aspects and goals would lead to a form of unsustainable management, undermining the paradigms explicit to ICZM.

Five-step process 

 Problem and needs assessment: Issues and problems need to be identified and assessments of these need to be quantified. This first step will include integration between government, sectoral entities and local residents. The assessments also have to be broad in their application. 
 Plan: After the issues and problems have been identified and weighted, an effective management plan can be made. The plan will be specific to the area in question. 
Institutionalization of plan: The adoption of the plan is carried out, which could be in the form of legally binding statutory plans, strategies or objectives which are generally quite powerful or they can be non-statutory processes and can act as a guide for future development. This duality is largely beneficial as the future can be taken into account, but still provide for a firm stance based in the present. 
 Implementation: Operationalization of the plan through law enforcement, education, development, etc. The implementation activities are unique to their environments and can take many forms. 
 Evaluation: The last phase is evaluation of the whole process. The principles of sustainability mean that there is no ‘end state.’ ICZM is an ongoing process which should constantly readjust the equilibrium between economic development and the protection of the environment. Feedback is a crucial part of the process and allows for continued effectiveness even when a situation may change.

Public participation and stakeholder involvement is essential in ICZM processes, not only in terms of a democratic approach, but also from a technical–instrumental point of view, in order to reduce decisional conflicts (Ioppolo et al., 2013).

Dimensions of coastal zone management

Defining coastal zones

Defining the coastal zone is of particular importance to the idea of ICZM. But the fuzziness of borders due to the dynamic nature of the coast makes it difficult to clearly define. Most simply the coast can be thought of as an area of interaction between the land and the ocean. Ketchum (1972) defined the area as:

The band of dry land and adjacent ocean space (water and submerged land) in which terrestrial processes and land uses directly affect oceanic processes and uses, and vice versa.

Issues arise with the diversity of features present on the coast and the spatial scales of the interacting systems. Coasts being dynamic in nature are influenced differently all around the world. Influences such as river systems, may reach far inland increasing the complexity and scale of the zone. These issues make it difficult to clearly identify hinterlands and subscribe any subsequent management.

Whilst acknowledging a physical coastal zone, the inclusion of ecosystems, resources and human activity within the zone is important. It is the human activities that warrant management. These activities are responsible for disrupting the natural coastal systems. To add to the complexity of this zone, administrative boundaries use arbitrary lines that dissect the zone, often leading to fragmented management. This sectored approach focuses on specific activities such as land use and fisheries, often leading to adverse effects in another sector.

Finding sustainable solutions 
The concept behind the idea of ICZM is sustainability. For ICZM to succeed, it must be sustainable. Sustainability entails a continuous process of decision making, so there is never an end-state just a readjustment of the equilibrium between development and the protection of the environment. The concept of Sustainability or sustainable development came to fruition in the 1987 report of the World Commission on Environment and Development, Our Common Future. It stated sustainable development is “to meet the needs of the present without compromising the ability of future generations to meet their own needs”.

Highlighted are three main standpoints which summarise the idea of Sustainable development, they are:
	Economic development to improve the quality of life of people
	Environmentally appropriate development
	Equitable development

To simplify these points, sustainability should acknowledge the right of humans to live a life that is healthy and productive. It should allow for equal distribution of benefits to all people and in doing so protect the environment through appropriate use.
 
Sustainability is by no means a set of prescriptive actions, more accurately it is a way of thinking. Adapting this way of thinking paves the way for a longer-term view with a more holistic approach, something successful ICZM can achieve.

Finding integration and synergies 

The term ‘integration’ can be adopted for many different purposes, it is therefore quite important to define the term in the context of the management of the coastal zone to appreciate the intentions of ICZM. Integration within ICZM occurs in and between many different levels, 5 types of integration that occur within ICZM, are explained below;

Integration among sectors: Within the coastal environment there are many sectors that operate. These human activities are largely economic activities such as tourism, fisheries, and port companies. A sense of co-operation between sectors is the main requirement for sector integration within ICZM. This comes from the realisation of a common goal focused around sustainability and the appreciation of one another within the area.

Integration between land and water elements of the coastal zone: This is the realisation of the physical environment being a whole. The coastal environment is a dynamic relationship between many processes all of which are interdependent. The link must be made between imposing a change on one system or feature and its inevitable ‘flow on’ effects.

Integration among levels of government: Between levels of governance, consistency and co-operation is needed throughout planning and policy making. ICZM is most effective where initiatives have common purpose at local, regional, and national levels. Common goals and actions increase efficiency and mitigate confusion.

Integration between nations: This sees ICZM as an important tool on a global scale. If goals and beliefs are common on a supranational scale, large scale problems could be mitigated or avoided.

Integration among disciplines: Throughout ICZM, knowledge should be accepted from all disciplines. All means of scientific, cultural, traditional, political and local expertise need to be accounted for. By including all these elements a truly holistic approach towards management can be achieved.

The term integration in a coastal management context has many horizontal and vertical aspects, which reflects the complexity of the task and it proves a challenge to implement.

Constraints
Successful implementation is still a major challenge to the idea of ICZM .

Top-down and bottom-up approach 
Major constraints of ICZM are mostly institutional, rather than technological. The ‘top-down’ approach of administrative decision making sees problematisation as a tool promoting ICZM through the idea of sustainability. Community-based ‘bottom-up’ approaches can perceive problems and issues that are specific to a local area. The benefit of this is that the problems are real and acknowledged rather than searched for to fit an imposed strategy or policy. Public consultation and involvement is very important for current ‘top-down’ approaches, as it can incorporate this ‘bottom-up’ idea into the policies made. Prescriptive ‘top-down’ methods have not able to effectively address problems of resource utilization in poor coastal communities as perceptions of the coastal zone differ with regard to developed and developing countries. This leads on to another constraint to ICZM, the idea of common property.

Human factors 
The coastal environment has huge historical and cultural connections with human activity. Its wealth of resources have provided for millennia, with regard to ICZM how does management become legally binding if the dominant perception of the coast is of a common area available to all? And should it? Enforcing restrictions or change to activities within the coastal zone can be difficult as these resources are often very important to people's livelihoods. The idea of the coast being common property fouls ‘top-down’ approaches. The idea of common property itself is not all that clean, This perception can lead to cumulative exploitation of resources – the very problem this management seeks to extinguish.

Adoption

European Union 

The European Parliament and the European Council "adopted in 2002 a Recommendation on Integrated Coastal Zone Management which defines the principles sound coastal planning and management. These include the need to base planning on sound and shared knowledge, the need to take a long-term and cross-sector perspective, to pro-actively involve stakeholders and the need to take into account both the terrestrial and the marine components of the coastal zone".

Iran

Preparation of comprehensive management plans for optimum utilization of existent sources and potentials in all developed and developing countries is one of the appropriate approaches for constant and permanent utilization of natural, human and financial sources. The versatility of natural sources in coastal areas has made private and governmental users and investors to participate in this section to gain the utmost profits. Therefore, the necessity of preparation and implementation of management plans for perpetual utilization of existent sources in coastal areas has become inevitable.
Iran, possessing some 6000 km of coastline in north and south, owns abundant economic capacities in coastal zones and regarding the versatility of nature and coast operators and management of coastal activities and operations, necessity of attention to Integrated Coastal Zone Management becomes more significant. Such necessity has gained its legal support through ratification of arrangements no. 40 from transportation chapter of third and article no. 63 of fourth economic, social and cultural economic schedule and its executive regulations.
The General Director of coasts and ports engineering of Ports and Maritime Organization was detailed to take the studies of ICZM into consideration. The first phase of these studies began in spring 2003 and was fulfilled in autumn 2006. The outcome of this phase was compilation of following reports accomplished by several national and international skilled consultants:
1- Project Methodology
2- Scrutinized scope of services related to studies
3- Investigation of studies' needs and project preparation and performance
4- Study, definition and determination of Iranian coastal zones boundaries
6- Investigation of International concepts, methods and experiences about Integrated Coastal Zone Management
7- Study and investigation of different features of Integrated Coastal Zone Management in Iran
8- Preparation and designation of geographic database
9- Purchasing and preparing basic data
The second phase of studies started up in autumn 2005 and since then this phase has been fully accomplished and presented, In which six competent Iranian consultants with some cooperation of international consultants are responsible for preparing the eleven results of second part of the studies.

Mediterranean

At the Conference of the Plenipotentiaries on the ICZM Protocol that took place on 20–21 January 2008 in Madrid, the ICZM Protocol was signed. Under the presidency of the Minister of Environment of Spain, H.E. Ms. Cristina Narbona Ruiz, fourteen Contracting Parties of the Barcelona Convention signed the Protocol. These are the following: Algeria, Croatia, France, Greece, Israel, Italy, Malta, Monaco, Montenegro, Morocco, Slovenia, Spain, Syria and Tunisia. All other Parties announced to do so in the very near future. This is the 7th Protocol in the framework of the Barcelona Convention, and the decision to approve the draft text and recommendation to the Conference of the Plenipotentiaries to sign it was taken at the 15th Ordinary Meeting of the Contracting Parties during their meeting in Almeria, on 15–18 January 2008. All the parties are convinced that this Protocol is a crucial milestone in the history of the Mediterranean Action Plan of the United Nations Environment Programme (UNEP/MAP), the first-ever Regional Seas Programme under UNEP's umbrella. It will allow the countries to better manage their coastal zones, as well as to deal with the emerging coastal environmental challenges, such as the climate change.

The ICZM Protocol is a unique legal instrument in the entire international community and the Mediterranean countries are proud of this fact. They are willing to share these experiences with other coastal countries of the world. The signing of the Protocol came after six years of dedicated work of all the Parties. Syria entered history for being the sixth, and "enter-into-force", country for the ICZM Protocol! Namely, the President of the Syrian Arab Republic issued a Legislative Decree No. 85 dated 31 September 2010 for the ratification of the ICZM Protocol. With this 6th ratification, the ICZM Protocol entered into force one month later provided that Syria deposits the instrument of ratification to the depositary country, i.e. Spain.
In September 2012, Croatia and Morocco ratified the Protocol, which brought the number of ratifications to 9 (Slovenia, Montenegro, Albania, Spain, France, European Union, Syria, Croatia, Morocco).

The Action Plan  for the implementation of the ICZM Protocol 2012-2019 was adopted on the occasion of the CoP 17, held in Paris from 8 to 10 February 2012. The core purposes and objectives of this Action Plan are to implement the Protocol based on country-based planning and regional co-ordination, namely:
1.    Support the effective implementation of the ICZM Protocol at regional, national and local levels including through a Common Regional Framework for ICZM;
2.    Strengthen the capacities of Contracting Parties to implement the Protocol and use in an effective manner ICZM policies, instruments, tools and processes; and
3.    Promote the ICZM Protocol and its implementation within the region, and promote it globally by developing synergies with relevant Conventions and Agreements.

A road-map for the implementation of the ICZM Process, prepared by Priority Actions Programme Regional Activity Centre (PAP/RAC), is available on the Coastal Wiki platform of the PEGASO and ENCORA projects: ICZM Process.

On May 8, 2014 the Israeli Government ratified the ICZM Protocol. This Resolution (#1588) was made in accordance with Article 19(b) of the Government Rules of Procedure. The ICZM Protocol ratification by Israel brings the number of ratifications to 10.

New Zealand

New Zealand is quite unique as it uses sustainable management within legislation, with a high level of importance placed on to the coastal environment. The Resource Management Act (RMA) (1991) promoted sustainable development and mandated the preparation of a New Zealand Coastal Policy Statement (NZCPS), a national framework for coastal planning. It is the only national policy statement that was mandatory. All subsequent planning must not be inconsistent with the NZCPS, making it a very important document. Regional authorities are required to produce Regional coastal policy plans under the RMA (1991) but strangely enough, they only need to include the marine environment seaward of the mean high water mark. But many regional councils have chosen to integrate the ‘dry’ landward area within their plans, breaking down the artificial barriers. This attempt at ICZM is still in its early days running into many legislative hurdles and is yet to achieve a fully ecosystems-based approach. But as part of ICZM, evaluation and adoption of changes is important and ongoing changes to the NZCPS in the form of reviews is currently happening. This will provide an excellent stepping stone for future initiatives and the development of a fully integrated form of coastal management.

See also

 Beach erosion and accretion
 Beach evolution
 Beach nourishment
 Modern recession of beaches
 Raised beach

 Coastal management, to prevent coastal erosion and creation of beach
 Coastal and oceanic landforms
 Coastal development hazards
 Coastal erosion
 Coastal geography
 Coastal engineering
 Hard engineering
 Soft engineering
 Coastal morphodynamics
 Coastal and Estuarine Research Federation (CERF)
 Human impacts on coasts
 Sea level rise
 Natural hazard

 Erosion
 Bioerosion
 Blowhole
 Natural arch
 Wave-cut platform

 Longshore drift
 Deposition (sediment)
 Coastal sediment supply
 Sand dune stabilization
 Submersion

References

External links
European Commission Coastal Zone Policy
ENCORA Coastal WIKI -EU Coordination Action on ICZM
Overview ICZM courses in Europe
Examining Best Practices in Coastal Zone Planning Lessons and Applications for British Columbia's Central Coast
Coastal Zone Management Policy and Politics Class 
Safecoast Knowledge exchange on coastal flooding and climate change in the North Sea region
ICZM principles
ZonaCostera | KüstenZone | CoastalZone | FrangeCôtière | KustStrook: Wiki in development with relevant and on-time information, useful for the integrated management of the coastal zones of our world. Integrated development is everybody's business!
EUCC Marine Team: ICZM in Europe
Coastal Zone Management Unit in Barbados
Integrated Coastal Zone Management in Iran
Videos
Free Educational Videos about Coastal Policy and Zone Management
The Future of Coastal Policy textbook overview

Coastal geography